The 1969 U.S. Pro Tennis Championships – Singles was an event of the 1969 U.S. Pro Tennis Championships men's tennis tournament played on outdoor hard courts at the Longwood Cricket Club in Boston, United States from July 9 through July 15, 1969. First-seeded Rod Laver was the defending champion and regained his singles title, defeating second-seeded John Newcombe in the final, 7–5, 6–2, 4–6, 6–1.

Draw

See also
 Laver–Rosewall rivalry

References

External links
 ITF tournament edition details

U.S. Pro Tennis Championships
U.S. Pro Tennis Championships – Singles